Charles Stuart, Duke of Cambridge may refer to either of two sons of James, Duke of York (later James II of England & VII of Scotland):

 Charles Stuart, Duke of Cambridge (1660–1661), son of James, Duke of York and Anne Hyde
 Charles Stuart, Duke of Cambridge (1677), son of James, Duke of York and Mary of Modena

See also
 Charles Stuart, Duke of Kendal